Schouteden's sun snake (Helophis schoutedeni) is a species of snake in the subfamily Natricinae of the family Colubridae.  The species, which is monotypic in the genus Helophis, is endemic to Central Africa.

Etymology
The specific name, schoutedeni, is in honor of Belgian zoologist Henri Schouteden.

Geographic range
H. schoutedeni is found in the Democratic Republic of the Congo and Republic of the Congo.

Description

References

Further reading
de Witte G-F (1922). "Description d'un ophidien nouveau récolté au Congo par le Dr Schouteden ". Revue zoologique africaine 10: 318–319. (Pelophis, new genus, p. 318; Pelophis schoutedeni, new species, pp. 318–319). (in French).
de Witte G-F, Laurent RF (1942). "Contribution à la faune herpétologique du Congo belge ". Revue de zoologie et de botanique africaines 36 (2): 101–115. (Helophis, new genus; Helophis schoutedeni, new combination). (in French).
Nagy, Zoltán T.; Gvoždík, Václav; Meirte, Danny; Collet, Marcel; Pauwels, Olivier S.G. (2014). "New data on the morphology and distribution of the enigmatic Schouteden's sun snake, Helophis schoutedeni (de Witte, 1922) from the Congo Basin". Zootaxa 3755 (1): 96–100.

Natricinae
Monotypic snake genera
Reptiles described in 1942
Reptiles of the Democratic Republic of the Congo
Reptiles of the Republic of the Congo